Rick Todd (born October 3, 1962) is a Canadian professional golfer who played on the PGA Tour, Nationwide Tour, Asian Tour, Japan Golf Tour and the Canadian Tour.

Todd was born in Toronto, Ontario. He played college golf at the University of Texas at El Paso (UTEP). He was second team All-American in 1986, third team in 1985 and honorable mention in 1984 and made the All-WAC first team four years in a row. He won four tournaments while at UTEP and was elected into the El Paso Golf Hall of Fame in 1984. He turned pro in 1987.

Todd joined the PGA Tour in 1990, earning his card through qualifying school. After an unsuccessful year on Tour, he joined the Ben Hogan Tour (now Nationwide Tour) where he won the Ben Hogan El Paso Open in his rookie season. The following year he won the Ben Hogan Dakota Dunes Open. In his last full season on the Tour in 1993 he recorded three top-10 finishes.

Todd won the Asia Golf Circuit Order of Merit in 1996, which qualified him on the Japan Golf Tour, where he played in 1996 and 1997. He won three times on the Canadian Tour between 1991 and 1997.

Todd was the head coach at his alma mater, UTEP, from 1999 to 2011 and was named WAC Coach of the Year in 2001.

Todd represented his country in 1996 at the World Cup and the Dunhill Cup.

Amateur wins (1)
1985 Ontario Amateur

Professional wins (5)

Ben Hogan Tour wins (2)

Ben Hogan Tour playoff record (1–0)

Canadian Tour wins (3)
1991 Victoria Open, Alberta Open
1997 Payless Open

Results in major championships

CUT = missed the half-way cut
"T" = tied
Note: Todd never played in the Masters Tournament or the PGA Championship.

Canadian national team appearances
World Cup: 1996
Dunhill Cup: 1996

See also 

 1989 PGA Tour Qualifying School graduates

References

External links

Profile at UTEP's official athletic site

Canadian male golfers
UTEP Miners men's golfers
PGA Tour golfers
Asian Tour golfers
Japan Golf Tour golfers
College golf coaches in the United States
Golfers from Toronto
1962 births
Living people